Najwa Shihab (born in Ujung Pandang, South Sulawesi, Indonesia on September 16, 1977) is an Indonesian actress and journalist of mixed Bugis and Arabic descent. She is the second daughter of former Minister of Religious Affairs in the Cabinet of Development VII Quraish Shihab and a niece of former Minister of Foreign Affairs Alwi Shihab.

Early life 
Shihab attended Jakarta High School No. 6 until 1996. During her time there, she was selected to join the American Field Service program where she got to stay in the United States for a year. Upon leaving high school, she started her law degree at University of Indonesia.

Career 
She started her journalistic career at RCTI in 2001 before joining the then recently established Metro TV. In the immediate aftermath of the 2004 tsunami, Shihab was flown to Aceh to file stories. There she witnessed the destruction caused by the tsunami alongside the decomposing bodies found all over the streets. Her reports and the interview with government officials raised her profile. She also received an award from the Indonesian Journalists Association for her reports.

In 2008 Shihab received an Australian Leadership Awards scholarship to study media law at the University of Melbourne.

After more than a decade at Metro TV, she quit the news channel in August 2017 and founded a news startup called Narasi TV in 2018.

In 2022, Shihab portrayed Nani Wijaya, the first Sri Asih in Sri Asih, who was portrayed by Mimi Mariani in 1954.

Mata Najwa 

Shihab started hosting her own talkshow Mata Najwa on Metro TV on 25 November 2009. It aired every Wednesday at 8 pm WIB to 9.30 pm WIB. Some of her guests included former presidents Habibie and Megawati Soekarnoputri, former vice presidents Boediono and Jusuf Kalla as well as then Jakarta governor Joko Widodo. Her show ended on 23 August 2017 on Metro TV as she decided to quit the channel. She and Mata Najwa returned to television but on a different channel, Trans7, on 10 January 2018.

Terawan interview 
In October 2020, Shihab was reported to the police by United Jokowi Volunteers chairperson Silvia Devi Soembarto for her stunt interviewing an empty guest chair where Minister of Health Terawan Agus Putranto was supposed to fill on 28 September 2020 edition of Mata Najwa. Through her Instagram account, Shihab stated that her interview was intentional so that public officials, especially Terawan who has been missing in action, would explain their policies in handling the COVID-19 pandemic and that the explanation does not necessarily have to be made on her show.

The empty chair interview was a first in Indonesia and Shihab deemed her action as still a form of journalism as it has been done by journalists in the United Kingdom and the United States as well.

References 

Indonesian journalists
Indonesian women journalists
Indonesian television presenters
Indonesian women television presenters
University of Indonesia alumni
Indonesian people of Arab descent
Bugis people
Living people
1977 births
People from Makassar
Melbourne Law School alumni